Som jag är (English: As I Am) is the third solo album by Swedish pop singer and ABBA member Agnetha Fältskog, released in late 1970.

Album information
The album was co-produced by Little Gerhard (Karl-Gerhard Lundqvist) and Agnetha's boyfriend at the time, Björn Ulvaeus. Recording took place in January 1970 ("Om tårar vore guld") as well as September and October of the same year. All songs were recorded in Metronome Studios, Stockholm. Like on her second album, two of the songs were composed by Agnetha herself ("Om tårar vore guld" and "Jag skall göra allt"), while she wrote the Swedish lyrics to a couple of cover versions. "Jag skall göra allt" was recorded in German as "Tausend Wunder" (Thousand Wonders).

The best known track is "Om tårar vore guld", a Svensktoppen top 3 hit, which was also released as the first single from the album. The song can be regarded as one of her most successful numbers in Sweden before the ABBA period and it was also a highlight in the set of her folk park tour in the summer of 1970. This was in spite of a claim from a Danish composer that she had used 22 bars from his composition "Tema", even though this had been written in the 1950s and had never been recorded. The case dragged on until 1977, when a settlement was reached and Fältskog paid the Dane SEK 5,000.

The album has since been re-issued both on CD, iTunes and vinyl.

Track listing

{{Track listing
| collapsed       = no
| headline        = Side B
| extra_column    = Title (English translation)
| total_length    = 17:16
| title1          = Hjärtats saga
| note1           = Arranged by Agnetha Fältskog, Björn Ulvaeus and Sven-Olof Walldoff 
| lyrics1         = Wilhelm Åström
| music1          = Wilhelm Åström
| extra1          = The Story of the Heart
| length1         = 2:21
| title2          = Spela vår sång
| note2           = Swedish version of "Melody Man" 
| lyrics2         = Agnetha Fältskog
| music2          = Tony Cole
| extra2          = <small>Play Our Song</small>
| length2         = 2:23
| title3          = Så här börjar kärlek
| note3           = med Björn Ulvaeus 
| lyrics3         = Peter Himmelstrand
| music3          = Peter Himmelstrand
| extra3          = This Is How Love Begins
| length3         = 2:35 swed.
| title4          = Du ska minnas mig
| note4           = Swedish version of "You'll Remember Me" 
| lyrics4         = Agnetha Fältskog
| music4          = Arthur Hamilton, Stan Worth
| extra4          = You Will Remember Me
| length4         = 3:14
| title5          = Jag ska göra allt 
| lyrics5         = Agnetha Fältskog
| music5          = Agnetha Fältskog
| extra5          = I Will Do Anything
| length5         = 3:50
| title6          = Sov gott min lilla vän
| note6           = Swedish version of "Un jour, un enfant" 
| lyrics6         = Agnetha Fältskog
| music6          = Emil Stern, Eddy Marnay
| extra6          = Sleep Well My Little Friend
| length6         = 2:50

}}

Singles

Altogether three singles (one of which being just a promo-single for radio) were released off Agnetha's third album. None of them charted on the official Swedish sales chart Kvällstoppen.
The first single, "Om tårar vore guld", features a cover version of "Little Altar Boy" on its b-side, titled "Litet Solskensbarn" (Little Child Of The Sun). The song was recorded together with "Om tårar vore guld" in early 1970, but subsequently left off the album.

Svensktoppen

Two tracks from "Som jag är" appeared on the important Swedish radio chart Svensktoppen, "Om tårar vore guld" being the most successful, reaching the top 3 and eventually staying on the chart for 15 weeks in the spring of 1970.

Charts

References
 booklet, Agnetha Fältskog: Agnetha Fältskog De Första Åren''
 https://web.archive.org/web/20100210202925/http://www.agnetha.net/AGNETHA.html

1970 albums
Agnetha Fältskog albums
Swedish-language albums
CBS Records albums